Callum Jake Hulme (born 10 November 2000) is an English footballer who most recently played as a midfielder for Premier League club Leicester City.

Career
Formerly a junior player at Manchester City, he arrived at Bury on 27 February 2017 to begin a two-year scholarship. Having been a regular in Bury's youth team since then, Hulme signed a full professional contract with the club on 26 January 2019. He had already made his first team debut in an EFL League Two match against Grimsby Town on Saturday, 8 September 2018, helping Bury to a 4–0 win.

Hulme signed for Premier League club Leicester City in August 2019. On 10 June 2022, it was announced that Hulme would be released from the club upon expiry of his contract at the end of the month.

Career statistics

References

English footballers
English Football League players
2000 births
Living people
Bury F.C. players
Leicester City F.C. players
Association football midfielders